Agonum antennarium is a species of ground beetle in the Platyninae subfamily, that can be found in Albania, Austria, Bulgaria, Czech Republic, France, Germany, Greece, Hungary, Italy, Moldova, Poland, Romania, Slovakia, Switzerland, Ukraine, and all the republics of the former Yugoslavia (except for Croatia).

References

Beetles described in 1812
antennarium
Beetles of Europe